Léon Eugene Barzin (November 27, 1900April 29, 1999) was a Belgian-born American conductor and founder of the National Orchestral Association (NOA), the oldest surviving training orchestra in the United States. Barzin was also the founding musical director of the New York City Ballet.

Life and career
Born in Brussels, Belgium on November 27, 1900, Léon Barzin was taken to the United States at the age of two. He studied the violin with his father (principal viola at the Théâtre de la Monnaie in Brussels and later of the Metropolitan Opera Orchestra), and later with Édouard Deru, Pierre Henrotte and Eugène Ysaÿe. He joined the New York Philharmonic in 1919 as a violinist and was appointed first viola in 1925, a position he retained until 1929, collaborating in those years with Willem Mengelberg, Wilhelm Furtwängler and Arturo Toscanini. It was at Toscanini's encouragement that he began his conducting career. In 1930 he was named principal conductor and musical director of the National Orchestral Association, America's leading proving ground for young professionals and a springboard for generations of young American instrumentalists. In this capacity he had a notable success for three decades. In public concerts and in weekly rehearsals, reaching a wide audience through the New York municipal radio station, he groomed his players in performances of the standard repertory.

Léon Barzin's influence on the quality of symphonic performance in the United States was enormous and long lasting, as thousands of young professional players emerged from the NOA to fill the ranks of the great American symphonic, ballet and opera orchestras. In 1958 he resigned from the association and moved to Paris, where he founded the Orchestre Philharmonique de Paris - giving weekly concerts in the Théâtre des Champs-Élysées - and taught conducting at the Schola Cantorum de Paris. He returned to New York as Music Director of the National Orchestral Association in 1970. In 1973 he took the NOA to Italy, where it was orchestra in residence at the Spoleto Festival Di Due Mondi, participating in Luchino Visconti's legendary production of Giacomo Puccini's Manon Lescaut. He resigned in 1976.

The great cellist Emanuel Feuermann considered Barzin to be one of the finest conductors of the twentieth century and indeed he was a most appreciated collaborator of the foremost soloists of the day. His years with the NOA were notable for the dazzling array of artists who appeared under his direction: Artur Schnabel, Claudio Arrau, Bronisław Huberman, Nathan Milstein, Ernst von Dohnányi, Emanuel Feuermann, William Primrose, Lillian Kallir, Joseph Szigeti, Felix Salmond, Myra Hess, Rudolf Serkin, Yehudi Menuhin, Ossip Gabrilowitsch, Lili Kraus, Mischa Elman, Elisabeth Schumann, Joseph Fuchs, Lillian Fuchs, Philippe Entremont, Leonard Rose, Zino Francescatti, Oscar Shumsky, William Kapell, Michael Rabin, David Nadien, Jacques Voois and Rosalyn Tureck.

Léon Barzin was one of the founders of the New York City Ballet and of its predecessor, Ballet Society, with Lincoln Kirstein and George Balanchine. He remained as Music Director for ten years. A guest conductor with such orchestras as the New York Philharmonic and the Minneapolis Symphony Orchestra, he was Director of the Tanglewood Music Center and in charge of education at the New England Conservatory of Music.

A great master of the baton, Barzin was a much sought after teacher of conducting in New York and later in France - at his home in the rue Monceau, Paris and at the Pavilion d'Artois, Vaux-sur-Seine - and in Fribourg, Switzerland. His distinctive technique was taught as a standard at the Royal Academy of Music in London. He remained a vibrant and energetic educator right until his death on April 19, 1999 in Naples, Florida.

Impact on American music 
Léon Barzin trained generations of American musicians in technique and repertoire and through the NOA helped many young American musicians procure positions in professional orchestras.  He worked particularly hard to break down prejudices against women and minorities, focusing entirely on musicianship for positions in the NOA.

Notable performances 
Barzin conducted concerts with soloists including Emanuel Feuermann (cello), Ossip Gabrilowitsch (piano), Mischa Elman and Joseph Szigeti (violin), Myra Hess, Rudolf Serkin (piano) and Artie Shaw (clarinet). He also developed radio programs on WNYC and WQXR and guest conducted the Minneapolis Symphony Orchestra, the Saint Louis Symphony Orchestra, and the NBC Symphony Orchestra.

Private life
Léon Barzin married four times and divorced three times, and had two sons, Richard and Léon Q. Barzin, and one daughter, Lora (Childs). His wives were: Marie Sherman Vandeputte (1928; one son, one daughter), Jane Goodwin (1939), Wilhelmina Quevli (1949; one son), Eleanor Post Close, daughter of Marjorie Merriweather Post (1956).

Awards and honors
Barzin was awarded the Columbia University Ditson Award, the Gold Medal of Lebanon, the Theodore Thomas Award of the Conductor's Guild and was a recipient of the Légion d'honneur.

Video/discography
DVD video - Leon Barzin and The National Orchestral Association copyright 2004 The National Orchestral Association 110 minutes
Leon Barzin conducting the National Orchestral Association in a 1971 video recording
Bizet: Roma (Ballet), Chabrier: Bourée fantasque (Ballet)  - New York City Ballet Orchestra - Vox PL9320 (LP: 33 Record)
Mozart: Haffner Symphony (No. 35 in D major), Berlioz: Waverley Overture and three excerpts from The Damnation of Faust - Orchestra drawn from the alumni of the National Orchestral Association - Columbia Masterworks ML5176 (LP: 33 Record)
Nathan Milstein: Mendelssohn Concerto in E minor, Bruch Concerto No. 1 in G Minor - Philharmonia Orchestra conducted by Leon Barzin - Capitol Records P8518 (LP: 33 Record)
Beethoven: Piano Concerto No. 3 in C, Op. 37, Movements 2 (largo) and 3 (rondo): National Orchestra Association (1937) - William Kapell, soloist (age 14 - his earliest surviving recording) - Arbiter 108 (CD)
G. Kleinsinger-P.Tripp, Victory Jory Symphony Orchestra: Tubby The Tuba - Cosmopolitan DMR 101 (78 RPM)
Kay-Balanchine: Western Symphony/Thomson-Christensen: Filling Station - New York City Ballet Orchestra conducted by Leon Barzin - Vox Records PL 9050 (LP: 33 Record)

References

External links
 The National Orchestral Association
 The New York Times - Obituaries
 Orchestre Léon Barzin
 Association Léon Barzin

1900 births
1999 deaths
American male conductors (music)
Ballet conductors
New York City Ballet
Academic staff of the Schola Cantorum de Paris
20th-century American conductors (music)
20th-century male musicians
Belgian emigrants to the United States